Brazos Valley is a planned rail station on the Texas Central Railway high-speed line between Dallas and Houston. It is located in Roans Prairie, Texas, northeast of the intersection of Texas State Highway 90 and Texas State Highway 30 in the Brazos Valley. A shuttle bus is expected to provide service to Texas A&M University.

References

External links
Texas Central Railroad Brazos Valley station press release
Railway stations scheduled to open in 2026
Texas Central Railway
Railway stations in Texas
Buildings and structures in Grimes County, Texas
Proposed railway stations in the United States